Cylindera debilis, the grass-runner tiger beetle, is a species of flashy tiger beetle in the family Carabidae. It is found in Central America and North America.

References

Further reading

 

debilis
Articles created by Qbugbot
Beetles described in 1890